was a Japanese Protestant Christian pacifist, Christian reformer, and labour activist. Kagawa wrote, spoke, and worked at length on ways to employ Christian principles in the ordering of society and in cooperatives. His vocation to help the poor led him to live among them. He advocated for women's suffrage and promoted a peaceful foreign policy.

Early life
Kagawa was born in Kobe, Japan to a philandering businessman and a concubine. Both parents died while he was young. He was sent away to school, where he learned from two American missionary teachers, Drs. Harry W. Myers and Charles A. Logan, who took him into their homes.

Kagawa learned English from these missionaries and converted to evangelical Protestant Christianity after taking a Bible class in his youth, which led to his being disowned by his remaining extended family. Kagawa studied at Tokyo Presbyterian College, and later enrolled in Kobe Theological Seminary. While studying there, Kagawa was troubled by the seminarians' concern for technicalities of doctrine. He believed that Christianity in action was the truth behind Christian doctrines. Impatiently, he would point to the parable of the Good Samaritan. From 1914 to 1916 he studied at Princeton Theological Seminary. In addition to theology, through the university's curricular exchange program he also studied embryology, genetics, comparative anatomy, and paleontology while at Princeton.

Activism
In 1909 Kagawa moved into a Kobe slum with the intention of acting as a missionary, social worker, and sociologist. In 1914 he went to the United States to study ways of combating the sources of poverty. In 1916 he published Researches in the Psychology of the Poor based on this experience in which he recorded many aspects of slum society that were previously unknown to middle-class Japanese. Among these were the practices of illicit prostitution (i.e., outside of Japan's legal prostitution regime), informal marriages (which often overlapped with the previous category), and the practice of accepting money to care for children and then killing them.

Kagawa was arrested in Japan in 1921 and again in 1922 for his part in labour activism during strikes. While in prison he wrote the novels Crossing the Deathline  and Shooting at the Sun. The former was a semi-autobiographical depiction of his time among Kobe's destitute. After his release, Kagawa helped organize relief work in Tokyo following the 1923 Great Kantō earthquake and assisted in bringing about universal adult male suffrage in 1925.

He organized the Japanese Federation of Labour as well as the National Anti-War League in 1928. Throughout this period, he continued to evangelize to Japan's poor, advocate women's suffrage and call for a peaceful foreign policy. Between 1926 and 1934 he focused his evangelical work through the Kingdom of God Movement.

Arthur Miller writes about hearing Kagawa give an evangelical lecture in Hill Auditorium at the University of Michigan in Ann Arbor, in 1935, and describes him as "a merchant of the sublime."

In 1940, Kagawa made an apology to the Republic of China for Japan's occupation of China, and was arrested again for this act. After his release, he went back to the United States in a futile attempt to prevent war between that nation and Japan. He then returned to Japan to continue his attempts to win women's suffrage. After Japan's surrender, Kagawa was an adviser to the transitional Japanese government.

During his life, Kagawa wrote over 150 books. He was nominated for the Nobel Prize in Literature in 1947 and 1948, and for the Nobel Peace Prize in 1954 and 1955.

Health and death
In Osaka, March, 1955, Kagawa suffered collapse from his deteriorating heart, and remained bedridden for 2 weeks. He continued writing, preaching, overseeing projects, and hosting guests, despite concerns from his family and associates. Kagawa's condition worsened throughout the years, and he was hospitalized again, for 3 months in 1959, at Saint Luke's Hospital in Takamatsu.
Kagawa remained bedridden at home for most of his time in Matsuzawa. His health gradually improved in mid-April, then worsened again. On April 23, Kagawa was unconscious for 3 hours, then woke and smiled to his wife and others around him, his last words being "Please do your best for world peace and the church in Japan."

Brotherhood economics
Kagawa's economic theory, as expressed in the book Brotherhood Economics, advocated that the Christian Church, the cooperative movement, and the peace movement unite in a 'powerful working synthesis' to provide a workable alternative to capitalism, state socialism, and fascism.
Kagawa's work in the co-operative movement consisted of founding several consumer co-operatives in 1921, including the Co-op Kobe, Nada Consumer Co-operative (later merged with Co-op Kobe), the Kyoto Consumer Co-operative, Tokyo Student's Consumer Co-operative and Tokyo Iryou (Medical) Consumer Co-operative.

Three-dimensional forestry
While studying at Princeton University, Kagawa read Tree Crops: A Permanent Agriculture by Joseph Russell Smith. Inspired by this book, he managed to persuade many of Japan's upland farmers during the 1930s that the solution to their soil erosion problem lay in widespread tree-planting. Kagawa also advised that they could receive further benefit if they planted crop trees, such as quick-maturing walnuts, to provide feed for their pigs.

The planting of fruit and nut trees on farmland aims to conserve the soil, supply food for humans and provide fodder for animals, the three "dimensions" of his system. Kagawa was a forerunner of modern forest farming and an inspiration to Robert Hart who pioneered forest gardening in temperate climates.

Legacy
After his death, Kagawa was awarded the second-highest honor of Japan, induction in the Order of the Sacred Treasure. The Evangelical Lutheran Church in America commemorates him as a renewer of society on April 23; Kagawa is also honored with a feast day on the liturgical calendar of the Episcopal Church (USA) and on the Calendar of the Presbyterian Church (USA) on that day.

Famous quotes

 On the morning of 1946, at the Imperial Palace in Tokyo, before Emperor Hirohito, "Whosoever will be great among you... shall be the servant of all. A ruler's sovereignty, Your Majesty, is in the hearts of the people. Only by service to others can a man, or nation, be godlike."
 "Communism's only power is to diagnose some of the ills of disordered society. It has no cure.  It creates only an infantile paralysis of the social order."
 "I read in a book that a man called Christ went about doing good. It is very disconcerting to me that I am so easily satisfied with just going about."
 "It seemed that everyone was attacking me – the Soviet Communists, the anarchists, the capitalists, the foul-mouthed literary critics, the sensationalist newspaper men, the Buddhist who could not compete with Christ, and those many Christians who profess Christ but believe in a Christianity which is sterile."

Works

See also

 List of civil rights leaders
 Japanese dissidence during the Shōwa period

References

Further reading

 .
 Charlie May Simon. 1958. A Seed Shall Serve – A Story of Toyohiko Kagawa Spiritual Leader of Modern Japan.  New York: EP Dutton & Co.
 Trout, Jessie M. (1960). Kagawa, Japanese prophet: His witness in life and word. New York: Association Press. WorldCat Link
 Richard H. Drummond, A History of Christianity in Japan. Grand Rapids: Eerdmans, 1971.
 Robert Schildgen. 1988. Toyohiko Kagawa. Apostle of Love and Social Justice.  Berkeley: Centenary Books.
 
 
 
 Bo Tao. 2013. The Peacemaking Efforts of a Reverse Missionary: Toyohiko Kagawa before Pearl Harbor. International Bulletin of Missionary Research Vol. 37, No. 3: 171–76.
 Thomas John Hastings, Seeing All Things Whole: The Scientific Mysticism and Art of Kagawa Toyohiko (1888–1960), Pickwick Publications, 2015.

External links
 

1888 births
1960 deaths
Anglican saints
Cooperative advocates
Cooperative organizers
Cooperative theorists
Japanese anti-communists
Japanese anti-fascists
Japanese Christian pacifists
Japanese economists
Japanese educators
Japanese evangelicals
Japanese theologians
Japanese Protestants
Japanese socialists
Japanese suffragists
Japanese trade unionists
Japanese writers
Members of the House of Peers (Japan)
Non-interventionism
People celebrated in the Lutheran liturgical calendar
People from Kobe